Herd Management Areas (HMA) are lands under the supervision of the United States Bureau of Land Management (BLM) that are managed for the primary but not exclusive benefit of free-roaming "wild" horses and burros. While these animals are technically feral equines descended from foundation stock that was originally domesticated, the phrase "wild horse" (and wild burro) has a specific meaning in United States law, giving special legal status to the descendants of equines that were "unmarked and unclaimed" on public lands at the time the Wild and Free-Roaming Horses and Burros Act of 1971 (WFRHBA) was passed. Horses that escaped or strayed from other places onto public lands after December 15, 1971 did not automatically become protected "wild horses". Today there are approximately 270 HMAs across 10 states, comprising . Additional herd areas (HAs) had free-roaming horse or burro populations at the time the Act was passed and some still have horse or burro populations today, but unlike the HMAs, they are not managed for the benefit of equines. In addition, some free-roaming equines protected under the WFRHBA are found on lands managed by the National Park Service (NPS), and United States Forest Service (USFS), where they are called wild horse territories (WHT). The BLM sometimes manages equine populations for other federal agencies, the USFS manages some of its own WHTs, and sometimes the agencies administer these areas jointly.

Equine population estimates in each HMA can vary significantly from year to year, depending on habitat condition in a given area, fecundity of the animals, or if a gather has occurred. Census-gathering methods also vary, and wild horse advocacy groups frequently question the validity of the population counts.  Nonetheless, each HMA is given an Appropriate Management Level (AML), usually given as a range showing upper and lower limits. This is the BLM's assessment of the number of equines the land can sustain. When the population gets too high, some animals are removed and placed for adoption with private owners or sent to long-term holding facilities elsewhere. Since 1971, about 220,000 horses and burros have been adopted through the BLM.

The original feral horse herds in the Americas were of Spanish horse ancestry.  Additional stock brought by eastern settlers moving west, ranging from draft horses to Arabians and Thoroughbreds, added a variety of other horse types.  Today, a few populations retain relatively pure Spanish type, but most are a mixture of bloodlines. Some herds have had DNA testing to determine their ancestry.

Description

The BLM distinguishes between "herd areas" (HA) where feral horse and burro herds existed at the time of the passage of the Wild and Free-Roaming Horses and Burros Act of 1971, and "Herd Management Areas" (HMA) where the land is currently managed for the benefit of horses and burros, though "as a component" of public lands, part of multiple use management, and thus not exclusively as equine habitat. When the 1971 Act was passed, the BLM assessed herd areas to determine which places could become HMAs based on whether they had adequate food, water, cover, and space to "sustain healthy and diverse wild horse and burro populations over the long-term".  Some herd areas still contain feral horses or burros but for a number of reasons—including size of herd, habitat, and land ownership—they are not currently managed for equines by the BLM.  Additional wild, free-roaming horses and burros are found on Wild Horse and Burro Territories in six states under the auspices of the United States Forest Service (USFS) and are also protected by the Act. Some of the USFS territories are managed in cooperation with the BLM. The USFS has about 50 Wild Horse and Burro Territories.  There are also some protected free-roaming equine populations found on lands governed by the National Park Service (NPS).

Today there are approximately 270 separate HMAs across 10 states.  In 1971, free-roaming horses were found on 53.8 million acres of federal land, designated as herd areas. From this land base, 31.6 million acres became HMAs, of which 26.9 million acres are managed by the BLM.  In addition, some herd areas still are identified as having free-roaming horse populations.

Several laws and specific regulations govern the management of free-roaming horses and burros on federal lands, both those managed by the BLM and those managed by the USFS. These include the Wild Horse Protection Act of 1959, the Wild and Free-Roaming Horses and Burros Act of 1971, as amended by the Federal Land Policy and Management Act of 1976 and the Public Rangelands Improvement Act of 1978. The United States Code of Federal Regulations (CFR) addresses management of wild free-roaming horses and burros at 36 CFR 222 Subpart B.

Though population numbers in individual HMAs vary significantly from year to year, the total population of free-roaming horses overall exceeds the target population that the BLM considers to be the appropriate management level. Horses can eat close to their weight in forage in a month, and in some areas, such as the very arid climate of Nevada, it can take  or more to sustain one horse for one month. 2013 population counts of horse numbers under the management of the BLM estimated there were over 33,000 horses located on Herd Management Areas. There were also approximately 6,800 burros under BLM management.  the BLM estimated a total of 49,209 horses and burros were roaming free on BLM-managed lands. Though the 2015 AML maximum was set at 26,715, in 2016, that total was 55,311 horses and 11,716 burros.  Over half of all the free-roaming horses and burros under the management of the BLM live in Nevada, where there are 83 separate HMAs. 

Population of free-ranging horses is a concern because, unlike wildlife or livestock, horses are not hunted, do not face significant natural predators, nor are their numbers human-controlled by means of grazing permits.  Without population control, their numbers can double every four years. With current management practices, numbers currently are increasing by about 15% to 18% each year.  , 48,447 equines that had been captured, removed from the range were kept in holding facilities in various locations throughout the west and midwest. Many of these excess animals are eligible to be placed for "adoption" with private owners.  Since 1971, about 220,000 horses and burros have been adopted through the BLM.  In the early 2000s, about 8,000 horses a year were adopted, but at present, there are only about 2,500 horses adopted each year. The BLM attributes this to changing economic conditions. Of those remaining in the wild, the estimated 67,027 horses and burros are two and a half times the population in 1971 when the Act was passed and about twice the recommended Appropriate Management Level (AML).  Besides removal of about 3,500 animals in 2016 to long-term holding facilities and adoption, the BLM hopes to use fertility control and other tools to reduce numbers of horses on the range.

Summaries of population by state

List of HMAs
Actual population numbers vary widely from year to year, but often the numbers exceed the AML for a given herd management area. The AML for each range usually has an upper and a lower limit. Types of horses range widely in size, coat color, conformation and historic origins, from horses tracing to Colonial Spanish Horse origins to horses descended from locally escaped ranch and farm stock well into the mid-20th century.  Many burro herds descend from animals strayed from mining operations.

HMAs that cross state boundaries are included with the state which administers the HMA.  The number of areas listed below does not equal 270 for several reasons:  First, some herd areas still contain free-roaming horse and/or burro populations and are included in the BLM lists. Second, some USFS wild horse territories are listed by the BLM because they managed under a cooperative agreement, particularly those where USFS and BLM land are adjacent and the same herd crosses into both areas.  Third, some HMAs are contiguous and/or jointly administered as a single unit; some of these also may cross state lines, and finally, BLM records vary annually; changing conditions or planned management decisions may remove animals altogether, land swaps and management decisions may transfer land between federal agencies or into private ownership, some areas move from HMA to HA status.

Arizona

California

Colorado

Idaho

Montana

Nevada

New Mexico

Oregon

Utah

Wyoming

Forest Service wild horse territories
In addition to the Bureau of Land Management Herd Management Areas, the United States Forest Service also has wild horse territories that fall under the Wild and Free-Roaming Horses and Burros Act of 1971.  Some are managed in conjunction with the BLM and about 37 are managed by the USFS. Though called "wild horse territories", a few contain burros.  Current territories identified as such by the USFS, listed by the state office that manages each, include the following:

Arizona
Deep Creek, Arizona/New Mexico
Double A, Arizona†

California
Big Bear Wild Burro Territory, California†
Black Mountain Wild Horse Territory, California
Brushy Mountain Wild Horse Territory, California
Devil's Garden Plateau Wild Horse Territory, California†
McGavin Peak Wild Horse Territory, California† ††
Saline Valley, California
Three Sisters Wild Horse Territory, California
White Mountain Wild Horse Territory, California/Nevada

Nevada
Burro Wild Burro Territory, Nevada
Butler Basin Wild Horse Territory, Nevada
Cherry Spring Wild Horse Territory, Nevada
Dobbin Summit Wild Horse Territory, Nevada
Ellsworth Wild Horse Territory, Nevada
Johnny, Nevada†
Kelly Creek Wild Horse Territory, Nevada
Little Fishlake Wild Horse Territory, Nevada†
Monitor Wild Horse Territory, Nevada† (USFS manages BLM North Monitor HMA)
Monte Cristo Wild Horse Territory, Nevada†
Mount Moriah, Nevada
Murphy Wash, Nevada
Northumberland Wild Horse Territory, Nevada
Paradise Peak Wild Horse Territory, Nevada
Powell Mountain, Nevada
Quinn, Nevada
Red Rock, Nevada†
Seven Mile, Nevada
Shoshone Wild Horse Territory, Nevada
Spring Mountains, Nevada
Stone Cabin, Nevada†
Tierney Wild Horse Territory, Nevada
Toiyabe Wild Horse Territory, Nevada
Toquima Wild Horse Territory, Nevada

New Mexico
Caja del Rio Wild Horse Territory, New Mexico
Chicoma, New Mexico
Deep Creek, Arizona/New Mexico
Dome, New Mexico
Heber, New Mexico
Jarita Wild Horse Territory, New Mexico (aka Jarita Mesa)
Jicarilla Wild Horse Territory, New Mexico†
Mesa de Las Viegas, New Mexico
Mesa Montosa, New Mexico
Saguaro, New Mexico
San Diego, New Mexico

 Oregon
Big Summit, Oregon 114 horses (AML 50–60)
Murderer's Creek, Oregon† 254 horses (AML 50–140)

Utah
Big Creek Wild Horse Territory, Utah
North Hills, Utah†

Notes

References

Herd Management Areas
BLM Herd Management Areas
Horses in the United States
Donkeys
Feral horses
Fauna of the Western United States
BLM Herd Management Areas
Types of horse